Prince Jean-Bretagne-Charles de La Trémoille (5 February 1737 – 19 May 1792), 7th Duke of Thouars, was a French soldier and the son of Charles Armand René de La Trémoille and his wife, Marie Hortense de La Tour d'Auvergne of Bouillon.

Life
La Trémoille began his military career in the Seven Years' War as the head of the regiment of Aquitaine-Cavalry. He was seriously wounded and afterwards promoted to the rank of sergeant, and later of brigadier, of the armies of the king.

During the French Revolution, La Trémoille remained faithful to King Louis XVI. He emigrated in 1789, but two of his sons died in the Reign of Terror.

Marriage
La Trémoille married Marie-Genevieve de Durfort (1735-1762), the daughter of Guy-Michel de Durfort, Duc of Lorges and Randan, Marshal of France, and Élisabeth Philippine of Poitiers de Rye, Countess of Neufchatel, on 18 February 1751. They did not have children. On 27 June 1763 he married again to Marie-Maximilienne, princess of Salm-Kyrburg (1744-1790) the daughter of Prince Philip Joseph I, Prince of Salm-Kyrburg and Princess Maria Theresa van Hornes.

From his second marriage, the La Trémoille had four sons:

Charles Bretagne Marie de La Trémoille, born 24 March 1764, died 10 November 1839.
Antoine Philippe de La Trémoille, prince de Talmont, born on 27 September 1765 and guillotined on 29 January 1794. 
Charles Godefroy de La Trémoille, canon, born on 27 September 1765 and guillotined on 15 June 1794. 
Louis Stanislas de La Trémoille, prince of Trémoille, born on 12 June 1767 and died in August 1837. He married Genevieve de Maulévrier-Langeron (died in 1829), and later married Augusta Murray.

1737 births
1792 deaths
French nobility
House of La Trémoille
French princes
Dukes of Thouars
Dukes of La Trémoille
Counts of France
French military personnel
French people of the Seven Years' War
French military personnel of the Seven Years' War
18th-century French people
18th-century peers of France
18th-century French military personnel
People of Byzantine descent